Syntomodrillia hypsela is a species of sea snail, a marine gastropod mollusk in the family Drilliidae.

Description
The length of the shell attains 4.8 mm.

(Original description) The high, narrow shell has a conical shape. It contains 6 very short whorls. The body whorl is exceptionally small, with a short conical base and very small snout. The suture is 
very slight, but extremely oblique. The apex is blunt and rounded. There are narrow, high, rounded, curved, and very oblique ribs, which run continuously from the apex to the point of the base, but not to the snout. There are obsolete spiral striae, which become stronger on the point of the columella. The original specimen of this very marked species is in too bad condition for more minute description.

Distribution
This marine species occurs off Pernambuco, Brasil.

References

External links
 Gastropods.com: Syntomodrillia hypsela
  Tucker, J.K. 2004 Catalog of recent and fossil turrids (Mollusca: Gastropoda). Zootaxa 682:1–1295.
 Fallon P.J. (2016). Taxonomic review of tropical western Atlantic shallow water Drilliidae (Mollusca: Gastropoda: Conoidea) including descriptions of 100 new species. Zootaxa. 4090(1): 1–363

hypsela
Gastropods described in 1881